Visa requirements for Bahamian citizens are administrative entry restrictions by the authorities of other states placed on citizens of The Bahamas. As of February 27th 2023; Bahamian citizens have visa-free or visa on arrival access to 155 countries and territories, ranking the Bahamian passport 27th in terms of travel freedom according to the Henley Passport Index.

Visa requirements map

Visa requirements
Visa requirements for holders of normal passports travelling for tourist purposes:

Dependent, disputed, or restricted territories
Unrecognized or partially recognized countries

Dependent and autonomous territories

Non-visa restrictions

See also

Visa policy of Bahamas
Bahamian passport

References and Notes
References

Notes

Bahamas
Foreign relations of the Bahamas